was a town located in Hōsu District (formerly from Fugeshi District), Ishikawa Prefecture, Japan.

As of 2003, the town had an estimated population of 7,512 and a density of 47.68 persons per km². The total area was 157.56 km².

On February 1, 2006, Monzen was merged into the expanded city of Wajima.

Dissolved municipalities of Ishikawa Prefecture
Wajima, Ishikawa